Yaroslav Amosov (born 9 September 1993) is a Ukrainian mixed martial artist. He currently competes in the Welterweight division of Bellator MMA, where he is the current Bellator Welterweight Champion. As of February 28, 2023, he is #3 in the Bellator men's pound-for-pound rankings.

He is a four-time world sambo champion, a two-time European and Eurasia champion, and European Cup winner. Amosov is also the winner of many national and international competitions.

Sambo career

Yaroslav Amosov was born on September 9 , 1993  in the city of Irpin, Kyiv region. He began to actively engage in combat sambo at the age of fifteen at the initiative of his stepfather, trained at the Kyiv club "Hermes" under the guidance of coaches Fedor Mykolayovych Seredyuk and Vadym Mykhailovych Korytny.

He achieved his first serious success at the adult international level in 2012, when he won the European Combat Sambo Cup. Subsequently, he achieved significant success in this martial arts: he became the world champion three times according to the version of the international federation WCSF (2013, 2014, 2015) and twice the champion of Europe according to the version of the European federation ECSF (2013, 2014). In September 2014, he became the champion of Eurasia in professional combat sambo, defeating the experienced Russian fighter Shamil Zavurov in the final with a suffocating reception. He repeatedly won championships and Cups of Ukraine in combat sambo. In March 2015, he was awarded the honorary title "Honored Master of Sports of Ukraine" for his outstanding sports achievements.

In September 2012, though early into his Combat Sambo career, Amosov came finished in third place against Ikram Aliskerov in European Combat Sambo Federation sanctioned competition that was being hosted in Moldova. In December of that same year, Amosov again came in third place against Aliskerov in World Combat Sambo Federation sanctioned competition that was held in Moscow.

Mixed martial arts career

In June 2016, after winning sixteen fights in a row in Tech-Krep FC, Amosov beat Croatian fighter Roberto Soldić to win the vacant Tech-Krep welterweight title.

In 2017, Amosov made two successful defences of the Tech-Krep FC welterweight title against Diogo Cavalcanti and Nathan Oliveira. Amosov won both fights via submission in the first round.

Bellator MMA

In November 2017. Bellator announced they had signed Yaroslav Amosov to the promotion following an undefeated run of 19 fights which only included two decisions.

Amosov made his Bellator debut against Gerald Harris on 13 July 2018 at Bellator 202. Amosov won the fight via unanimous decision.

Amosov then faced Erick Silva on 16 February 2019 at Bellator 216.
Amosov won the fight via unanimous decision.

Amosov then faced David Rickels on 24 August 2019 at Bellator 225 in a catchweight bout.
Amosov defeated Rickels via brabo choke in the second round. This was Rickels' first submission loss in his career.

Amosov then faced three-time NCAA Division I Wrestling Champion from Penn State Ed Ruth on 21 February 2020 at Bellator 239. Amosov won the fight via unanimous decision.

Amosov faced Mark Lemminger on 21 August 2020 at Bellator 244. He won the fight via TKO between rounds 1 and 2 due to a cut rendering Lemminger unable to continue.

Amosov faced four-time NCAA Division I All-American from Minnesota Logan Storley on November 12, 2020 at Bellator 252. He won the back-and-forth bout by split decision.

Bellator Welterweight Championship
Amosov fought for the Bellator Welterweight World Championship against current champ Douglas Lima at Bellator 260 on June 11, 2021. He won the fight by unanimous decision by outwrestling Lima throughout all 5 rounds.

Amosov was scheduled to make his first title defense against Michael Page on May 13, 2022 at Bellator 281. However, Amosov was forced to pull out of the bout due to his participation in the war in Ukraine on the side of Ukraine, leaving Page to compete against Logan Storley for the interim title. 

After being unable to fight for all of 2022 due to the war, Amosov returned to defend his title in a rematch against interim champion Logan Storley on February 25, 2023 at Bellator 291. He successfully defended the title after defeating Storley by unanimous decision, the fight scored 50–45 on all three judges scorecards.

Personal life

During the 2022 Russian invasion of Ukraine, after seeing his family evacuated to a safe zone, Amosov stayed in Ukraine and joined several other notable fighters, including former boxing heavyweight champion Wladimir Klitschko and his brother, former heavyweight champion Vitali Klitschko, current unified WBA (Super), IBF, WBO and IBO heavyweight champion Oleksandr Usyk, and former lightweight champion Vasyl Lomachenko, in defending Ukraine from the Russian invasion. During this time, Amosov was the Bellator Welterweight Champion. After the liberation of his hometown Irpin from the battle over the town, Amosov published a video of himself rescuing the Bellator Welterweight Champion belt, which was hidden at his mother's home.

Championships and accomplishments

Mixed martial arts
Bellator MMA
Bellator Welterweight World Championship (One time, current)
One successful title defence
First Ukrainian-born champion in Bellator MMA history
Tech-Krep FC 
Tech-Krep FC Welterweight Championship (One time)
Two successful title defenses

Sambo  
 World Combat Sambo Championship 
 European Combat Sambo Championship  
Combat Jiu-Jitsu World Cup 
 World Combat Sambo Championship 
Combat Jiu-Jitsu World Championship 
Combat Sambo Eurasia Championship

Mixed martial arts record

|-
|Win
|align=center|27–0
|Logan Storley
|Decision (unanimous)
|Bellator 291
|
|align=center|5
|align=center|5:00
|Dublin, Ireland
|
|-
|Win
|align=center|26–0
|Douglas Lima 
|Decision (unanimous)
|Bellator 260
|
|align=center|5
|align=center|5:00
|Uncasville, Connecticut, United States
|
|-
|Win
|align=center|25–0
|Logan Storley 
|Decision (split)
|Bellator 252 
|
|align=center|3
|align=center|5:00
|Uncasville, Connecticut, United States
|
|-
|Win
|align=center|24–0
|Mark Lemminger	
|TKO (doctor stoppage)
|Bellator 244 
|
|align=center|1
|align=center|5:00
|Uncasville, Connecticut, United States
| 
|-
|  Win
| align=center|23–0
| Ed Ruth
| Decision (unanimous)
| Bellator 239 
| 
| align=center|3
| align=center|5:00
| Thackerville, Oklahoma, United States
|
|-
|  Win
| align=center|22–0
| David Rickels
| Submission (D'Arce сhoke)
| Bellator 225 
| 
| align=center|2
| align=center|4:05
| Bridgeport, Connecticut, United States
| 
|-
|  Win
| align=center|21–0
| Erick Silva
| Decision (unanimous)
| Bellator 216 
| 
| align=center|3
| align=center|5:00
| Uncasville, Connecticut, United States
|
|-
|  Win
| align=center|20–0
| Gerald Harris
| Decision (unanimous)
| Bellator 202 
| 
| align=center|3
| align=center|5:00
| Thackerville, Oklahoma, United States
|
|-
|  Win
| align=center|19–0
| Nathan Oliveira
| Submission (anaconda choke)
| Tech-Krep FC: Prime Selection 17
| 
| align=center|1
| align=center|3:20
| Krasnodar, Russia
| 
|-
|  Win
| align=center|18–0
| Diogo Cavalcanti
| Submission (north-south choke)
| Tech-Krep FC: Prime Selection 12
| 
| align=center|1
| align=center|4:48
| Krasnodar, Russia
| 
|-
|  Win
| align=center|17–0
| Roberto Soldić
| Decision (split)
| Tech-Krep FC: Prime Selection 8
| 
| align=center|3
| align=center|5:00
| Krasnodar, Russia
| 
|-
|  Win
| align=center|16–0
| Khasanbek Abdulaev
| TKO (punches)
| Tech-Krep FC: Southern Front 3
| 
| align=center|2
| align=center|2:47
| Krasnodar, Russia
|
|-
|  Win
| align=center|15–0
| Maxim Konovalov
| Submission (anaconda choke)
| Tech-Krep FC: Battle in Siberia
| 
| align=center|1
| align=center|2:34
| Novosibirsk, Russia
| 
|-
|  Win
| align=center|14–0
| Islam Berzegov
| Submission (rear-naked choke)
| Tech-Krep FC: Prime Selection 7
| 
| align=center|1
| align=center|1:27
| Krasnodar, Russia
| 
|-
|  Win
| align=center|13–0
| Diego Gonzalez
| KO (punch)
| Tech-Krep FC: Prime Selection 4: Grandmasters
| 
| align=center|2
| align=center|2:38
| Krasnodar, Russia
| 
|-
|  Win
| align=center|12–0
| Ravil Risaev
| Submission (north-south choke)
| Tech-Krep FC: Ermak Prime Challenge
| 
| align=center|1
| align=center|1:27
| Anapa, Russia
|
|-
|  Win
| align=center|11–0
| Avtandil Gachechiladze
| Submission (armbar)
| ECSF: Steel Warriors
| 
| align=center|2
| align=center|1:45
| Kyiv, Ukraine
|
|-
|  Win
| align=center|10–0
| Oleg Olenichev
| Decision (unanimous)
| Tech-Krep FC: Battle of Heroes
| 
| align=center|3
| align=center|5:00
| St. Petersburg, Russia
| 
|-
|  Win
| align=center|9–0
| Boris Selanov
| TKO (punches)
| GEFC: Mega Fight
| 
| align=center|1
| align=center|3:40
| Kyiv, Ukraine
|
|-
|  Win
| align=center|8–0
| Aydin Aikhan
| TKO (punches)
| ECSF: Ukraine vs. Turkey
| 
| align=center|1
| align=center|1:40
| Kyiv, Ukraine
| 
|-
|  Win
| align=center|7–0
| Aleksey Nimirovich
| TKO (punches)
| rowspan=2|CSFU: Voshod Open Cup
| rowspan=2|
| align=center|1
| align=center|2:40
| rowspan=2|Kyiv, Ukraine
|
|-
|  Win
| align=center|6–0
| Andrei Shalavai
| TKO (punches)
| align=center|1
| align=center|3:10
|
|-
|  Win
| align=center|5–0
| Valeri Shpak
| Submission (armbar)
| GEFC: Warriors Empire
| 
| align=center|1
| align=center|2:50
| Kyiv, Ukraine
| 
|-
|  Win
| align=center|4–0
| Vadim Sandulskiy
| Submission (rear-naked choke)
| League S-70: Plotforma 4th
| 
| align=center|3
| align=center|3:03
| Sochi, Russia
| 
|-
|  Win
| align=center|3–0
| Vitaliy Matornika
| Submission (rear-naked choke)
| CSFU: MMA Kiev Cup 2
| 
| align=center|1
| align=center|4:47
| Kyiv, Ukraine
|
|-
|  Win
| align=center|2–0
| Artiom Cula
| TKO (punches)
| ECSF - Battle of Bessarabia
| 
| align=center|2
| align=center|1:49
| Chisinau, Moldova
|
|-
|  Win
| align=center|1–0
| Vitaliy Maystrenko
| TKO (punches)
| CSFU: MMA Kyiv Cup
| 
| align=center|1
| align=center|4:49
| Kyiv, Ukraine
|

See also
 List of current Bellator fighters
 List of male mixed martial artists
 List of undefeated mixed martial artists

References

1993 births
Living people
Sportspeople from Kyiv
Ukrainian male mixed martial artists
Welterweight mixed martial artists
Mixed martial artists utilizing sambo
Ukrainian sambo practitioners